Samuel Norton may refer to:

Samuel Norton (alchemist) (1548–1621), English writer
Samuel Norton, a character in The Shawshank Redemption
Samuel Tilden Norton (1877–1959), Los Angeles-based architect

See also
Sam Norton-Knight (born 1983), Australian rugby union footballer